Kachankawal is a rural municipality out of 7 rural municipalities of Jhapa District of Koshi Province of Nepal. There are total 15 local administrative units in Jhapa District in which 8 are urban and 7 are rural municipalities.

The rural municipality was established merging former VDCs: Gherabari, Pathariya, Kechana, Pathamari, Baniyani and Balubadi.

Mr.Kalendra prasad singh Rajbanshi of Nepali Congress has elected as a chairperson of the rural municipality and Mr. Nawaraj Bhattarai of the Nepal Communist Party Yemale party elected for the vice-chairperson after the results of the local level elections held in Nepal on 27 June 2022.

KachanKawal the lowest point of Nepal, which elevation is 58 m above sea level is located in this rural municipality.

Constituencies
Parliamentary constituency: Kachankawal RM is a part of Jhapa 3 parliamentary constituency and Rajendra Prasad Lingden is the MP of Jhapa 3 who was elected in 2017 Nepalese general election, who is the candidate of Rastriya Prajatantra Party.
Provincial constituency: Kachankawal with Bhadrapur Municipality comprises "Jhapa 3 (A)" Provincial constituency and Bashanta Kumar Baniya (Nepal Communist Party) is the MLA.

Neighborhoods
Gherabari
Pathariya
Kechana
Pathamari
Baniyani
Balubadi

Demographics
Total population of the Kachankawal RM is 39,593 with 8,742 households, in which  20,832 (51.5%) are female and remaining all 18,761 are male according to the 2011 Nepal census. 66% of the total population can read and write which is categorised as "Educated people". The number of educated female is lower than male. Only 56% female of the total female population (20,832) are educated while 76% male are educated.

Major population of the RM is Hinduism follower. 79% of the total population follow Hinduism while Islam is the second largest religion in the RM with 15% follower. Remaining 6% population follow Buddhism, Kirat, Christianity etc. There are castism in Hindus. Hindus are categorised in many casts as follows:

Rajbanshi is the biggest group in the RM so Rajbanshi language is most spoken language with 44% speaker. Nepali is the 2nd most spoken language with 25% speaker. Remaining 31% speaks Urdu,, Maithili,Surjapuri language, Santhali, Limbu, tamang etc.

References

Populated places in Jhapa District
Rural municipalities in Koshi Province
Rural municipalities of Nepal established in 2017
Rural municipalities in Jhapa District